Rafael Antonio Cortijo (December 11, 1928 – October 3, 1982) was a Puerto Rican musician, orchestra leader, composer and percussion instrument craftsman.

Early Career
As a child, Cortijo became interested in Caribbean music and enjoyed the works of some of the era's most successful Bomba y Plena music musicians. Throughout his life, he had a chance to meet and work with some of them, and learned how to make his own congas and pleneras, the handheld drums used in bomba y plena music.

Salsa composer and singer Ismael Rivera met Cortijo when both were youngsters, as they both grew up in the Villa Palmeras neighborhood of Santurce; they became lifelong friends. Rivera was impressed with Cortijo's conga-playing skills and was asked to join his orchestra, which played at Fiestas patronales all over Puerto Rico.

“Cortijo himself was discovered, or given his earliest encouragement by “Mr. Babalú,” the celebrated Cuban singer Miguelito Valdés. Getting his formal start in 1942 as a bongo player with Conjunto Monterey, the young Cortijo played with a range of groups in those years and made a radio appearance with Trio Matamoros. But is breakthrough came in 1954 when he joined pianist Rafael Ithier on the Secco label with his soulmate Ismael Rivera…”

Later Career

By 1954, Cortijo was a member of "El Combo".  His big break with the group came when El Combo's leader and pianist, Mario Román, left the band to Cortijo expecting to return to the band after a New York gig with Myrta Silva. Román never returned to the band in pursuit of other interests in New York's Latin music scene. Ismael Rivera, then the lead singer of Lito Peña's Orquesta Panamericana, joined Cortijo's orchestra known as Cortijo y su Combo in 1955. From then until 1960, his orchestra played live on Puerto Rican television shows (sometime in the 1960s, they became the house band at La Taberna India).

Later on, Cortijo created another orchestra, "El Bonche", where he was joined by his adopted niece, Fe Cortijo. Fe then became a well known singer on her own. Marvin Santiago became part of Cortijo's line-up around this time.

Cortijo and Rivera went on to live in New York City. Cortijo, then, soon returned to Puerto Rico, where the composer, Tite Curet Alonso, forged a friendship with the impoverished star and helped Cortijo produce a comeback album.

Cortijo y su Combo
In 1954, Cortijo y su Combo was composed of Rafael Ithier on piano, Cortijo on timbal, Roberto Roena on bongo, Martín Quiñones on congas, Eddie Pérez (the "female" voice of the choros) and as singer the sonero Ismael Rivera. In addition to Miguel Cruz on bass, Kiko Vélez and Mario Cora played trumpet.

“Aside from its strikingly new musical sound and best-selling recordings, Cortijo y su Combo was also an act, an all-black performative presence on the cultural stage that had the effect of challenging many of the long-held values and prejudices of the national culture.  Most significantly, they achieved immense sand startling visibility on television – staring frequently in memorable showcase appearances in popular show such as La Taberna India and El show del Mediodía.”

Ismael Rivera recorded the following songs with Cortijo y su Combo:

"El Bombón de Elena"
"El Negro Bembón"
"Juan José"
"Besitos de Coco"
"Palo Que Tú Me Das"
"Quítate de la Vía Perico"
"Oriza"
"El Chivo de la Campana"
"Maquinolandera"
"El Yayo"
"María Teresa"
"Yo Soy del Campo"

The orchestra virtually disbanded in 1962 when Ismael Rivera was arrested for drug possession in Panama. According to later reports, various band members concealed illegal drug shipments regularly since they were rarely intercepted at Customs; in this particular occasion an inspection was indeed made, and Rivera willingly took the bulk of the rap for the entire group (including Cortijo, who was deeply affected by Rivera's plea and regretted it through the rest of his life).Their friendship was so important to Rivera, that when Cortijo died, Rivera said he would no longer sing. Rafael Ithier and other bandmates went on to found Puerto Rico's salsa group, "El Gran Combo".

In 1974, Coco Records reunited all the former members of "Cortijo y su Combo" orchestra for a one-time-only concert and a subsequent studio recording issued a few months afterwards.
Rafael Cortijo became well known across Latin America. He attributed his success to the sound of his percussion, according to Cortijo, Afro-Caribbean music was known worldwide. A member of the Conjunto Monterrey, based in Monterrey, Mexico, he later toured with Daniel Santos' orchestra and worked on radio.

Death
Cortijo died of  pancreatic cancer on October 3, 1982, at his sister Rosa Cortijo's apartment in the Luis Llorens Torres public housing project in Santurce, Puerto Rico. He was buried at Cementerio San José in San Juan, Puerto Rico. He was posthumously inducted into the International Latin Music Hall of Fame.

References

External links
 

1928 births
1982 deaths
Puerto Rican people of African descent
People from Santurce, Puerto Rico
20th-century Puerto Rican musicians
American percussionists
Barril players
Deaths from pancreatic cancer
Deaths from cancer in Puerto Rico
20th-century drummers
20th-century African-American musicians